The CAVITEX Braves are a Philippine 3x3 basketball team which competes in the PBA 3x3, organized by the Philippines' top-flight professional league, Philippine Basketball Association (PBA). The team is affiliated with the NLEX Road Warriors, a member franchise of the PBA.

History
The NLEX Road Warriors are among the participating PBA franchise teams in the inaugural 2021 PBA 3x3 season. Instead of competing under the same name as their mother team, the 3x3 team competed under the name "CAVITEX Braves", named after the Manila–Cavite Expressway (CAVITEX).

Current roster

References

PBA 3x3 teams
2021 establishments in the Philippines
Basketball teams established in 2021